Croceicoccus is a genus in the phylum Pseudomonadota (Bacteria).

Etymology
The name Croceicoccus derives from:Latin adjective croceus, yellow, golden; New Latin masculine gender noun coccus (from Greek masculine gender noun kokkos (κόκκος)), grain or berry; New Latin masculine gender noun Croceicoccus, yellow coccus, referring to a yellow coccoid-shaped bacterium.

Species
The genus contains a single species, namely C. marinus ( Xu et al. 2009,  (Type species of the genus).; Latin masculine gender adjective marinus, of or belonging to the sea, marine.)

See also
 Bacterial taxonomy
 Microbiology

References 

Bacteria genera
Sphingomonadales
Monotypic bacteria genera